Martyn Auty (born July 1951 in Yorkshire) is an English film and television producer. He attended the University of Hull and graduated in 1972. He began his career as a film critic for Time Out and The Monthly Film Bulletin.

Auty is most famous for his series producing, having worked on Heartbeat and A Touch of Frost during the 1990s, however, he has also worked on a variety of other styles of programme. These include Lenny Live and Unleashed, Soul Survivors, and A Gentleman's Relish. The latter, which starred Billy Connolly, was made for the BBC in 2001. Auty returned to shooting a new series of A Touch of Frost in 2009.

Auty has also ventured into making motion pictures, having produced A Foreign Field (1993), Heidi (2005), and most recently Ways to Live Forever (2010).

References

External links
 

1951 births
Living people
Alumni of the University of Hull
English television producers
English film critics
Film people from Yorkshire
English film producers